"What Do I Get?'" is a single by punk rock band Buzzcocks and its B-side is "Oh Shit". It provided Buzzcocks with their UK chart début, peaking at No. 37 on the UK Singles Chart.

It has been covered by a number of artists, such as Steve Lieberman. It makes an appearance in the video game Guitar Hero: Warriors of Rock and the movie Ghost World.

Track listing
"What Do I Get?" (Shelley) [2:50] 
"Oh Shit" (Shelley) [1:32]

References

1978 singles
Buzzcocks songs
Songs written by Pete Shelley
1978 songs
Song recordings produced by Martin Rushent
United Artists Records singles
British power pop songs